This is a list of Sanskrit-language poets.

A
 Manmohan Acharya 
 Agasthya Kavi
 Amaru

B
 Bharavi
 Bhartṛhari
 Bhāsa
 Bhatta Narayana
 Budhasvamin
 Banabhatta

D
 Daṇḍin
 P. C. Devassia
 Rahas Bihari Dwivedi

G
 Shatavadhani Ganesh
 Acharya Gyansagar

H
 Harisena

J
 Jatasimhanandi
 Jayadeva
 Jinaratna
 Jaimini
 Jayathirtha

K
 Kālidāsa
 Kilimanoor Raja Raja Varma Koithampuran
 Kshemendra
 Kuntaka
 Kavikalanidhi Devarshi Shrikrishna Bhatt

M
 Madhwacharya
 Madhuravani
 Magha
 Mallinātha Sūri
 Mithila Prasad Tripathi

N
Narayana Bhattathiri of Melpathur
Narayana Panditacharya of Dvaita tradition

P
 Jagannath Pathak
 Pāṇini
 Pandhareenathachar Galagali
 Prabodhananda Sarasvati

R
 Rambhadracharya
 Srinivas Rath
 Rewa Prasad Dwivedi
 Ram Karan Sharma
 Bhatt Mathuranath Shastri
 Shastri, Vidyadhar
 Kalika Prasad Shukla
 Palkuriki Somanatha
 Ramanuja

S
 Sharan
 Subandhu
 Śūdraka
 Shankaracharya

T
 Trivikrama Panditacharya of Dvaita Tradition

V
 Vallabha Acharya
 Valmiki
 Vedanta Desika
 Nudurupati Venkanna
 Vidyadhar Shastri
 Vikatanitamba
 Vilwamangalam Swamiyar
 Vishakhadatta
 Vyasa
 Vadiraja Tirtha
 Vyasaraja

See also
List of Indian poets
 Sanskrit revival
 List of Sanskrit universities in India
 List of Sanskrit academic institutes outside India
 List of historic Sanskrit texts 
 List of Sanskrit Buddhist literature
 List of legendary creatures in Sanskrit Hindu mythology 
 Symbolic usage of Sanskrit
 Sanskrit Wikipedia

References

Sanskrit
 
Sanskrit